Bertolo is an Italian surname.

Notable people with this surname include:
 Mario Bertolo (1929-2009), French cyclist
 Nicolás Bertolo (born 1986), Argentinian footballer

See also
 Bertol (surname)
 Bertoli
 Bertolini
 Bertoloni

Italian-language surnames